Brachynema axillare is a dicotyledonous plant species described by R. Duno de Stefano and Paul Edward Berry. Brachynema axillaries is part of the genus Brachynema and the family Olacaceae. No subspecies are listed in the Catalog of Life.

References 

Olacaceae